Peter Fratzscher (born 1950) is a German television and film director.

Selected filmography

Film
 Panic Time (1980)
  (1980)
 Andre Handles Them All (1985)
 Blutspur in den Osten (1995)
  (1998)
 Operation Guardian Angel (2009, TV film)

Television series
 Auf Achse (1986, 4 episodes)
 Ein Fall für zwei (1994–2010, 7 episodes)
 Kriminaltango (1995–1996, 11 episodes)
 Tatort (1997–2011, 11 episodes)

References

Bibliography
 Tom Zwaenepoel. Dem guten Wahrheitsfinder auf der Spur: das populäre Krimigenre in der Literatur und im ZDF-Fernsehen. Königshausen & Neumann, 2004.

External links

1950 births
Living people
German film directors
German television directors
Mass media people from Kassel